The George and Dragon is a public house in the village of Great Budworth, Cheshire, England. It is recorded in the National Heritage List for England as a designated Grade II listed building.

History
Great Budworth is a village that was formerly in the estate of Arley Hall. In the later part of the 19th century, its owner, Rowland Egerton-Warburton, undertook a "campaign to restore the village and render it picturesque in Victorian eyes". The George and Dragon was at that time a simple three-bay Georgian inn. In 1875 Egerton-Warburton commissioned the Chester architect John Douglas to undertake the restoration. Douglas added tall rubbed chimneys, mullioned windows and a steep pyramidal turret.

Architecture
The inn has three bays and is in two storeys. It is built in brick with a roughcast rendering on the upper storey. The roofs are hipped and covered in clay tiles. The central bay consists of a two-storey porch which projects forwards. Its lower storey has an elliptical-headed doorway, and in the upper storey is a four-light mullioned window. Each lateral bay has a four-light mullioned window in the lower storey and a three-light mullioned window in the upper storey. A tall rubbed brick chimneystack rises from the left side of the roof. Diagonally from the right corner is the inn sign. The cut-out pictorial sign itself originated in Nuremberg while its ornate wrought iron bracket was made by the estate blacksmith. On each side of the porch is an oak post-and-rail fence inscribed with a number of sayings. Above the inner door is a stone containing a verse written by Egerton-Warburton. Internally, in the bar, is a stone inscribed in Latin and the date 1722.

Present day
The George and Dragon continues to trade as a public house and restaurant.

See also

Listed buildings in Great Budworth
List of non-ecclesiastical and non-residential works by John Douglas

References

Commercial buildings completed in 1875
John Douglas buildings
Grade II listed pubs in Cheshire
1875 establishments in England
Saint George and the Dragon